Stenoptilodes maculatus is a moth of the family Pterophoridae that is known from Ecuador.

Adults are on wing in October.

External links

maculatus
Moths described in 2006
Endemic fauna of Ecuador
Moths of South America
Taxa named by Cees Gielis